Ferguson Ridge Ski Area (referred to locally as "Fergi") is a small ski area in northeastern Oregon located about  southeast of Joseph in the Wallowa mountains and near the Eagle Cap Wilderness. It's a small, community-run ski area, volunteer operated by the Eagle Cap Ski Club. Ferguson Ridge is open weekends and holidays 10AM-4PM when there is sufficient snow cover.

References

External links 
 Ferguson Ridge Ski Area
 Wallowa Winter Sports: Includes info on 'Fergi'

Ski areas and resorts in Oregon
Buildings and structures in Wallowa County, Oregon
Tourist attractions in Wallowa County, Oregon
1939 establishments in Oregon
Joseph, Oregon